The MTA Regional Bus Operations bus fleet is a fleet of buses in fixed-route service in New York City under the "MTA New York City Bus" (also known as New York City Transit or NYCT) and "MTA Bus" brands, both of which operate local, limited, express and Select Bus Service routes.

Description and history
The fleet consists of over 5,700 buses of various types and models for fixed-route service, making MTA RBO's fleet the largest public bus fleet in the United States. The MTA also has over 2,000 vans and cabs for ADA paratransit service, providing service in New York City, southwestern Nassau County, and the city of Yonkers. All vehicles, with the exception of paratransit cabs, are fully accessible to persons with disabilities. Fixed-route buses are dispatched from 28 garages (20 New York City Bus and 8 MTA Bus) and one annex in New York City.

Several fleet improvements have been introduced over the system's history. The first large order of air conditioned buses began service in 1966. "Kneeling buses" were introduced in 1976, and wheelchair lifts began appearing in 1980. Also in the 1980s, stop-request cords (or "bell cords") were replaced by yellow tape strips. However, buses ordered after 2008 feature cords rather than tape strips due to the latter's higher maintenance cost. Articulated buses were introduced in 1996, and have since become prominent in the Bronx and Manhattan. Low-floor buses, designed to speed boarding and alighting and improve riding conditions for elderly and disabled passengers, were first tested in 1997 and have made up most of the new non-express buses ordered since the early 2000s. Most post-2000 orders also feature stop-request buttons located on grab bars. Beginning in 2016, new orders along with buses built after 2011 will be built/retrofitted with Wi-Fi connectivity and USB charging ports.

Starting in 2016, efforts to bring an audio/visual system to the current and future fleet went underway to improve customer service and ADA accessibility thru use of next stop announcements & PSAs. Though the former Long Island Bus Division (now NICE Bus) had already deployed such a system throughout its fleet since the early-2000s, the MTA had only trialed similar systems alongside GPS tracking between 2007 and 2012 on select routes in the New York City Bus system. Current plans include the installation of digital information screens installed throughout the interior of the bus which will provide real-time information such as time, weather, advertisements, & service advisories. The screens are supplied by contract from 3 different vendors and are installed on new bus deliveries starting in 2017 while buses built after 2008 are currently receiving retrofits. A new livery was also introduced, replacing the blue stripe livery on a white base that had been in use in one variation or another since the late 1970s. The first of these buses entered service in mid-May 2016 on the Q10 route.

Buses operating on clean or alternative fuels also make up a significant portion of the fleet, particularly since the establishment of the MTA's "Clean Fuel Bus" program in June 2000. Buses running compressed natural gas (CNG) were first tested in the early 1990s, and were mass-ordered beginning in 1999. Hybrid-electric buses, operating with a combination of diesel and electric power, were introduced in September 1998 with the Orion VI, and mass-ordered beginning in 2002 with the Orion VII. These hybrid buses proved to be useful, at least the 2006-2007 models, for these models cost significantly less to repair and maintain than earlier units. As of December 2022, the fleet has over 1,100 diesel-electric buses and over 700 buses powered by compressed natural gas, which make up less than half of the total fleet. This is the largest fleet of either kind in the United States.

In 2017, the MTA ordered a test fleet of ten forty-foot battery-electric buses, five from New Flyer and five from Proterra, the XE40 Xcelsior CHARGE and Catalyst BE40 models respectively. These were all leases, which expired in 2021. In 2019, the MTA ordered their first battery-electric sixty-foot articulated buses, with an order of fifteen XE60 Xcelsior CHARGE buses from New Flyer, deployed on Manhattan Select Bus Service routes. In April 2021, the agency placed an RFP for forty-five new forty-foot battery-electric buses.

Later in 2021, the MTA awarded New Flyer the contract for the electric bus order, set to arrive in late 2022 and 2023. 15 more buses were added to the originally 45 bus contract, making for a total of 60 buses allotted for MTA NYCT.

Fixed-route fleet details
A roster of the fleet is shown below. Not included below are buses and vans not open to the general public (Access-A-Ride vans, taxicabs, and employee shuttle buses), retired buses, or demonstration buses. This list also does not include buses formerly operated by MTA Long Island Bus (now Nassau Inter-County Express) that are now operated under contract to Nassau County by Transdev.

Local, limited, & Select Bus Service vehicles
All buses listed below have semi-low floors.

Express bus fleet
All buses are high-floored.

Future bus fleet

References

External links 

MTA Regional Bus Operations